Assumption of the Blessed Virgin Mary Church in Żagań, Poland, is a Gothic  church built between the fourteenth and second-half of the fifteenth century. The church is part of the Roman Catholic Diocese of Zielona Góra-Gorzów.

References

Żagań County
Żagań